The Berners Street hoax was perpetrated by Theodore Hook in Westminster, London, England, in 1809. Hook had made a bet with his friend Samuel Beazley that he could transform any house in London into the most talked-about address in a week, which he achieved by sending out thousands of letters in the name of Mrs Tottenham, who lived at 54 Berners Street, requesting deliveries, visitors, and assistance.

History

On Monday, 27 November, at five o'clock in the morning, a sweep arrived to sweep the chimneys of Mrs Tottenham's house. The maid who answered the door informed him that no sweep had been requested, and that his services were not required. A few moments later, another sweep presented himself, then another, and another; twelve in all. After the last of the sweeps had been sent away, a fleet of carts carrying large deliveries of coal began to arrive, followed by a series of cakemakers delivering large wedding cakes, then doctors, lawyers, vicars and priests summoned to minister to someone in the house they had been told was dying. Fishmongers, shoemakers and over a dozen pianos were among the next to appear, along with "six stout men bearing an organ". Dignitaries, including the Governor of the Bank of England, the Duke of York, the Archbishop of Canterbury and the Lord Mayor of London, also arrived. The narrow streets soon became severely congested with tradesmen and onlookers. Deliveries and visits continued until the early evening, bringing a large part of London to a standstill.

Hook stationed himself in the house directly opposite 54 Berners Street, from where he and his friend spent the day watching the chaos unfold.

Despite a "fervent hue and cry" to find the perpetrator, Hook managed to evade detection, although many of those who knew him suspected him of being responsible. It was reported that he felt it prudent to be "laid up for a week or two" before embarking on a tour of the country, supposedly to convalesce.

After all was said and done, Hook won his one-guinea bet (£87 in 2021 terms).

The site at 54 Berners Street is now occupied by the Sanderson Hotel.

See also
 List of practical joke topics

References
Notes

Bibliography

External links
Museum of hoaxes article on the Berners Street hoax (States street number as 10 and the year as 1810)
London in the Nineteenth Century, The Guardian (London)

Berners Street prank
19th century in the City of Westminster
Practical jokes
Hoaxes in England
19th-century hoaxes
November 1810 events